Reynolds "Renny" Yater (born 1932 in Los Angeles) is a surfboard builder. He was one of the first commercial surfboard builders of the 1950s. Yater shaped fiberglass boards in the early 1950s, worked for  Hobie in the mid-1950s on balsa boards and in 1957 went to work for Dale Velzy's shop in San Clemente, California shaping balsa  boards. He opened Yater Surfboards in the fall of 1959 on Anacapa Street in Santa Barbara before moving the shop to Summerland, California in 1961. In 1964 zoning laws changes and in 1965 the shop opened on Gutierrez Street along with a retail surf shop at 401 State Street. In 1967 the shaping operation moved to Gray Avenue. The retail shop closed in 1971. His board designs include the Yater Spoon, Nose Specializer and Pocket Rocket. Customers included Joey Cabell, Gordon Clark, Mickey Dora, Philipi Pomar, Kemp Auberg, Bob Cooper, Bruce Brown and John Severson. Another Yater retail store opened in 1991 at 10 State Street in Santa Barbara and continues in business with Yater's son Lauren at the helm.

Yater had a role in 1960s surf movies including Big Wednesday (1961) and Walk On the Wet Side (1963). In the film Apocalypse Now (1979), Robert Duvall wears a Yater T-shirt and has a Yater Spoon board (an 8'6"), the latter of which is stolen by the patrol boat crew (in a scene that was cut from the original version, but seen in the Apocalypse Now Redux version).

References

1932 births
People from Los Angeles
Sporting goods manufacturers of the United States
Living people